Yanic Truesdale (born March 17, 1970) is a Canadian-American actor best known for his portrayal of Michel Gerard in the television series Gilmore Girls, a role that prompted Daily Variety to name him one of "10 Actors to Watch".

Biography
Truesdale holds dual Canadian and American citizenship. He stumbled into acting at the age of seventeen when he decided on a whim to audition for acting school. He was accepted and soon discovered his passion for acting. He studied at the National Theatre School of Canada before he began his television acting career in the long-running Canadian series He Shoots, He Scores. He was nominated for a Gemini Award for his role on the Québécois sitcom Roommates. He also starred in another Québécois French-language series on the SRC channel  called Majeur et vacciné. He was part of the Gilmore Girls cast from 2000 to 2007, and he returned for the 2016 revival of the series.

Truesdale moved to New York City and studied at the Lee Strasberg Theater Institute, then moved to Los Angeles, California.

In 2011, Truesdale moved back to his home city of Montreal, where he opened a spin studio called SpinEnergie, inspired by LA's dance style spin classes.

Filmography

References

External links
 
 Yanic Truesdale cast bio on The CW
 Yanic Truesdale as Michel Gerard-Bio

1970 births
Living people
Male actors from Montreal
Anglophone Quebec people
Black Canadian male actors
Canadian male television actors